The Chief of the National Guard General Staff is the professional head of the Cypriot National Guard. He is  responsible for the administration and the operational control of the Cypriot military. Due to the close links between the Republic of Cyprus and Greece, the office is always filled by a retired lieutenant general of the Hellenic Army. The current Chief of the National Guard is Lieutenant General Demokritos Zervakis.

List of Chiefs
Since its creation in 1964, these people have served as Chief of the National Guard:

References

Military of Cyprus
Cyprus